"Fire n Gold" is a song by American singer Bea Miller that serves as the second single from her debut EP Young Blood. It was released on April 22, 2014 through Hollywood Records and released as an official single on April 28, 2015. The track was produced by Jarrad Rogers and written by Rogers, Freddy Wexler and Nolan Sipe.

The song was certified Gold in the United States by the Recording Industry Association of America (RIAA), having sold over 500,000 copies.

Background
After placing ninth on the second season of The X Factor US, Bea Miller signed a record deal with Hollywood Records and Simon Cowell's Syco Music in January 2013, and subsequently started working on new songs.

Promotion
The song has been used for promos for ABC Family shows such as The Fosters and Switched at Birth. It was also used for Netflix shows' commercials. Additionally, it was prominently used as the theme music for ESPN's coverage of the 2015 NCAA Division I women's basketball tournament. Miller performed the song live on the Today Show on May 12, 2015.

Commercial performance
In the first week of August 2015, the song debuted at No. 78 on the Billboard Hot 100, making it her first song to chart. It previously had reached No. 17 on the Bubbling Under Hot 100 Singles chart.

Music video
The music video for "Fire n Gold" was filmed in March 2015. It was uploaded to Miller's official Vevo account on May 20, 2015. It was directed by Black Coffee. The video shows Miller lying on bed covered in polaroid photos before her friends emerge from the background shadows and dance with her. Miller said about the song, "It's reminding all the people who are really down in the dumps and who feel like they're alienated and like no one understands them and they're really alone that they do have a purpose in life and that they are here for a reason."

Track listing
Digital download
"Fire n Gold" – 3:32

Charts

Certifications

Release history

References

2014 songs
2015 singles
Bea Miller songs
Syco Music singles
Hollywood Records singles
Songs written by Nolan Sipe
Songs written by Freddy Wexler
Songs written by Jarrad Rogers